Ricardo Gouveia may refer to:

 Rigo 23 (Ricardo Gouveia, born 1966), Portuguese muralist, painter, and political artist
 Ricardo Gouveia (golfer) (born 1991), Portuguese golfer